The women's quadruple sculls rowing event at the 2015 Pan American Games was held from July 12–15 at the Royal Canadian Henley Rowing Course in St. Catharines.

Schedule
All times are Eastern Standard Time (UTC-3).

Results

Heat

Final

References

Women's rowing at the 2015 Pan American Games